Sindhology is a field of South Asian studies and academic research that covers the history, society, culture, literature and people of Sindh, a region that now comes in Pakistan. The subject was first brought into the academic circles with the establishment of the Institute of Sindhology at Sindh University in 1964. Since then, it has developed into a discipline that covers the aspects of history and archaeology from the Indus Valley civilization to the modern Sindhi society. The subject has also received wider attention at international levels. An academic or expert who specialises in Sindhology is called a Sindhologist.

History 

The term Sindhology to denote a subject of knowledge about Sindh was first coined in 1964 with the establishment of the Institute of Sindhology. The objective at the time was to promote the study and broader research on Sindh, and develop a repository of archives, books, manuscripts, and research papers. Another wider objective was to promote the knowledge about Sindh in various other national and regional languages of Pakistan, as well as international languages such as Arabic, English, Persian and Urdu.

The subject was actually developed on the patterns of Egyptology and Indology. The study area encompassed the multidisciplinary research about the land that has been shaped by the 5000 years old Indus Valley Civilization as well as the Indus river (locally known as Sindhu Darya). This enables the scope of the study to cover the antiquities, relics, culture, traditions, and literature with unique forms of music, art, and poetry that has prevailed in both the ancient and modern Sindh.

Organisations 
 Institute of Sindhology, Pakistan
 Indian Institute of Sindhology
 American Institute of Sindhology

Prominent Sindhologists 
The first major attempt to bring together the leading Sindhologists was an international seminar 'Sindh Through the Centuries' held in Karachi in Spring 1975 under the auspices of the Government of Sindh. Some of the prominent names in Sindhology include:

 Ali S. Asani
 Dr. Nabi Bux Khan Baloch
 Hassam-ud-Din Rashidi
 Ahmad Hasan Dani
 Annemarie Schimmel
 Allama I. I. Kazi
 Asko Parpola
 Dr. Ghulam Ali Allana
 Jean-François Jarrige
 N. G. Majumdar
 K. R. Malkani
 Muhammad Usman Diplai
 Ghulam Rabbani Agro
 Muhammad Qasim Maka

See also 
 Institute of Sindhology
 Encyclopedia Sindhiana
 University of Sindh
 Sindhi literature
 Sindhi Adabi Board
 Jamshoro
 List of museums in Pakistan

Notes

References 
 Government of Sindh (1994) Sind Through the Centuries, Proceedings of an International Seminar Held in Karachi in Spring 1975, by Department of Culture, Government of Sind. Oxford University Press, Karachi.

External links 
 Institute of Sindhology
 University of Sindh
 Indian Institute of Sindhology

 
Education in Pakistan
Indology
Pakistan studies